Landhuishotel Bloemenbeek is a hotel in De Lutte, Netherlands, set in 2.5 hectare grounds. It is noted for its Michelin-starred restaurant De Bloemenbeek  which serves French and Mediterranean cuisine, run by Michel van Riswijk as of 2014. The 57-room hotel had its origins when on  April 1, 1966, the Strikker family purchased a century  old farmhouse which had been a guesthouse and cafe. There is an 18-hole golf course in the vicinity.

Gallery

References

External links
Official site 

Hotels in the Netherlands
Michelin Guide starred restaurants in the Netherlands
Hotels established in 1966
Losser
1966 establishments in the Netherlands
20th-century architecture in the Netherlands